The 1975 Woolwich West by-election was a parliamentary by-election held  on 26 June 1975 for the British House of Commons constituency of Woolwich West in South East London.

The seat had become vacant when the constituency's Labour Member of Parliament (MP), William Hamling died on 20 March 1975.  He had held the seat since winning it from the Conservatives at the 1964 general election. It was the first by election since the general election the previous October.

Results 
The result of the contest was a victory for the Conservative candidate, Peter Bottomley, who held the seat until its abolition for the 1983 general election; he had contested the seat in both 1974 general elections. He then sat for Eltham, the successor seat and since 1997 has represented Worthing West, a safe Tory seat in Sussex.

As the result of the by-election was a Conservative gain from Labour, the result reduced the Labour majority in the House of Commons from 3 seats to 1 seat as their number of seats fell from 319 to 318 in a House of 635 members. However the position of the Labour Government was made worse by the fact one of its MPs John Stonehouse, was absent from the country.

This was the first by-election the Conservatives fought under the leadership of Margaret Thatcher, who abandoned a precedent that party leaders did not campaign in by-elections, by personally canvassing in support of Bottomley. Writing in The Glasgow Herald political correspondent John Warden stated that the victory would boost Mrs Thatcher by silencing "mutterings about her leadership" for at least a few months.

Votes

See also
1943 Woolwich West by-election
Woolwich West (UK Parliament constituency)
Woolwich
List of United Kingdom by-elections

References

Woolwich West,1975
Woolwich West by-election
History of the Royal Borough of Greenwich
Woolwich West,1975
Woolwich West by-election
Woolwich
Woolwich West by-election